Streets Ridge is a community in the Canadian province of Nova Scotia, located in  Cumberland County .

References
 Streets Ridge on Destination Nova Scotia

Communities in Cumberland County, Nova Scotia